Birch Hill is a southern suburb of Bracknell, originally part of the now-defunct civil parish of Easthampstead, in the English county of Berkshire. Although Birch Hill is a separate ward in Bracknell Town Council  it is combined with Hanworth to form Hanworth ward in Bracknell Forest Council. The Birch Hill estate was built in the 1970s on the slightly higher ground above South Hill Park, a Georgian and Victorian country house in beautiful parkland with two lakes (known locally as North Lake and South Lake), now an arts centre. Birch Hill is bounded by Hanworth to the west, Crown Wood and Forest Park to the north-east, Easthampstead to the north and Nine Mile Ride and the Crown plantations of Swinley Forest to the south.

Facilities include Birch Hill Primary School , a large Sainsbury's supermarket near the A322, a shopping centre that also serves Hanworth, a library, community centre and the Silver Birch public house.  Coral Reef Water Park  and the Look Out Discovery Centre  are nearby. The streets in Birch Hill are named in alphabetic order.  For example, the southernmost area includes from east to west Naseby, Northcott, Nutley, Oakengates, Octavia, Orion, Qualitas and Quintilis. Birch Hill was featured in an episode of Road Wars that was shown on Sky 3 on 12 November 2009.

References

Bracknell